Magma (Jonathan Darque) is a supervillain appearing in American comic books published by Marvel Comics. He first appeared in Marvel Team-Up #110, as an enemy of Spider-Man and Iron Man.

Fictional character biography
Jonathan Darque was the chief executive officer of a mining company investigating new and cheap sources of energy. His investigations were opposed by environmental activists, who held demonstrations at his trial bore sites. His wife died in a car crash when attempting to evade the activists' blockade. Darque used his engineering skills to design a battle suit allowing him to become Magma. He then developed an underground crime organization.

Darque/Magma created a device he called the Long Range Sonic Stata Scanner (LRSSS), which enabled him to discover the epicentres of earthquakes before they erupted. He also used the machine to generate waves causing earthquakes; this enabled him to blackmail the Mayor of New York City. (At the publication time of this story, the historical Mayor was Ed Koch). Magma held a press conference to reveal his plans. Spider-Man and Iron Man joined forces to drill down vertically to reach the source of the earthquake, where they discovered his hidden base. After Magma was defeated by Spider-Man and Iron Man in a battle on the surface, he escaped in a pod into the middle of the Atlantic Ocean.  Spider-Man aimed the LRSSS at this location and Magma was engulfed by the resultant waves and he disappeared into the depths of the ocean.

Magma was eventually arrested after several attempts to take over Stark Industries and some battles on the surface with Jim Rhodes in the Iron Man armor.

Subsequently Darque was paid by Roxxon Oil Company and offered a job to lead a secret research laboratory located in the middle of a mountain, part of the Ridge-and-valley Appalachians in Virginia. With the unwilling assistance of "idiot savant" Seth Hanks, a local boy, Darque attempted to develop a new electron projector that would allow powerful beams to be directed at Earth from a satellite. Spider-Man saved his colleague, the child and his mother from Magma's base and, accidentally, caused the collapse of the cave destroying the laboratory.

He fought the Human Torch in Brooklyn, where the Fantastic Four member's fire proved to be greater than the fire resistance of Magma's metal body. The fire melted Magma's equipment, and the asphalt under his feet, meaning that he was unable to continue the fight.

Powers and abilities
Magma's body armor was strong enough to survive a freefall from a ten-story building and was able to withstand 1200 degrees Celsius (the temperature of the magma under the Earth's crust). His armor was also able to protect him from intense nuclear radiation. Magma wore a spiked vest made of the same material as his armor. In addition, Magma had a blast gun implanted in his right arm that was able to fire balls of lava, which were created by a generator worn on his back.

References

External links

Comics characters introduced in 1981
Fictional businesspeople
Marvel Comics supervillains